Farley Hill may be a reference to:

Farley Hill, Saint Peter, Barbados, currently a national park in the parish of Saint Peter, Barbados
Farley Hill, Luton, a ward and suburb in south Luton, Bedfordshire, England
Farley Hill, Berkshire, a village in Berkshire, England

See also
 Farley (disambiguation)
 Farley Hall (disambiguation)
 Farley Hills, a mountain range in Baker County, Oregon
 Farnley Hall (disambiguation)